Viliam "Vili" Ameršek (born 16 August 1948) is a retired Slovenian football player who play in midfielder role.

He holds the record for seasons played for Olimpija Ljubljana with 16. While at Olimpija, he played with his brother Peter. He also had a spell of 3 years with Angers SCO.

References

External links

Pictures Vili Ameršek SCO Angers

1948 births
Living people
Yugoslav footballers
Yugoslav expatriate footballers
Slovenian footballers
Slovenian expatriate footballers
NK Olimpija Ljubljana (1945–2005) players
Angers SCO players
Yugoslav First League players
Ligue 1 players
Expatriate footballers in France
People from Trbovlje

Association football midfielders